The 2021–22 NBA season was the 77th season for the Sacramento Kings in the National Basketball Association (NBA), and 38th season in the city of Sacramento. The Kings entered the season with the longest NBA playoff appearance drought in league history with 15 seasons, tying the record with the Los Angeles Clippers. The last time the team had qualified for the playoffs was in 2006. In the 2021 NBA draft, the Kings selected Davion Mitchell from Baylor University with the ninth pick.

On November 22, head coach Luke Walton was fired after a mediocre 6–11 start; he was then replaced by Alvin Gentry on an interim basis.
For the 16th season in a row, the Sacramento Kings failed to reach the Playoffs, and thus passing the Clippers for the longest playoff drought
in NBA history. Following the season, the Kings' fired Gentry as head coach.

Draft picks

Roster

Standings

Division

Conference

Game log

Preseason

|-style="background:#cfc;"
| 1
| October 4
| Phoenix
| 
| Harrison Barnes (18)
| Richaun Holmes (8)
| Tyrese Haliburton (5)
| Golden 1 CenterN/A
| 1–0
|-style="background:#cfc;"
| 2
| October 6
| @ L.A. Clippers
| 
| De'Aaron Fox (23)
| Tristan Thompson (11)
| Tyrese Haliburton (5)
| Staples Center8,122
| 2–0
|-style="background:#cfc;"
| 3
| October 11
| @ Portland
| 
| Davion Mitchell (20)
| Chimezie Metu (7)
| De'Aaron Fox (5)
| Moda CenterN/A
| 3–0
|-style="background:#cfc;"
| 4
| October 14
| L.A. Lakers
| 
| De'Aaron Fox (21)
| Richaun Holmes (10)
| De'Aaron Fox (5)
| Golden 1 CenterN/A
| 4–0

Regular season

|-style="background:#cfc;"
| 1
| October 20
| @ Portland
| 
| Harrison Barnes (36)
| Richaun Holmes (11)
| De'Aaron Fox (8)
| Moda Center17,467
| 1–0
|-style="background:#fcc;"
| 2
| October 22
| Utah
| 
| Harrison Barnes (25)
| Harrison Barnes (15)
| Tyrese Haliburton (6)
| Golden 1 Center17,583
| 1–1
|-style="background:#fcc;"
| 3
| October 24
| Golden State
| 
| Harrison Barnes (24)
| Richaun Holmes (11)
| Tyrese Haliburton (9)
| Golden 1 Center13,876
| 1–2
|-style="background:#cfc;"
| 4
| October 27
| @ Phoenix
|  
| Buddy Hield (26)
| Richaun Holmes (12)
| De'Aaron Fox (9)
| Footprint Center14,678
| 2–2
|-style="background:#cfc;"
| 5
| October 29
| @ New Orleans
| 
| De'Aaron Fox (23)
| Harrison Barnes (12)
| Tyrese Haliburton (8)
| Smoothie King Center17,507
| 3–2
|-style="background:#fcc;"
| 6
| October 31
| @ Dallas
| 
| Richaun Holmes (22)
| Richaun Holmes (13)
| Harrison Barnes (5)
| American Airlines Center19,231
| 3–3

|-style="background:#fcc;"
| 7
| November 2
| @ Utah
| 
| Harrison Barnes (23)
| Richaun Holmes (10)
| De'Aaron Fox (9)
| Vivint Arena18,306
| 3–4
|-style="background:#cfc;"
| 8
| November 3
| New Orleans
| 
| Harrison Barnes (23)
| Harrison Barnes (8)
| Davion Mitchell (8)
| Golden 1 Center12,480
| 4–4
|-style="background:#cfc;"
| 9
| November 5
| Charlotte
| 
| Buddy Hield (26)
| Richaun Holmes (20)
| De'Aaron Fox (9)
| Golden 1 Center14,905
| 5–4
|-style="background:#fcc;"
| 10
| November 7
| Indiana
| 
| Harrison Barnes (22)
| Richaun Holmes (9)
| Davion Mitchell (6)
| Golden 1 Center12,993
| 5–5
|-style="background:#fcc;"
| 11
| November 8
| Phoenix
| 
| Harrison Barnes (26)
| Richaun Holmes (8)
| De'Aaron Fox (5)
| Golden 1 Center13,566
| 5–6
|-style="background:#fcc;"
| 12
| November 10
| @ San Antonio
| 
| De'Aaron Fox (37)
| Richaun Holmes (12)
| Fox, Mitchell (6)
| AT&T Center15,065
| 5–7
|-style="background:#fcc;"
| 13
| November 12
| @ Oklahoma City
| 
| Harrison Barnes (21)
| Richaun Holmes (15)
| Tyrese Haliburton (7)
| Paycom Center12,881
| 5–8
|-style="background:#cfc;"
| 14
| November 15
| @ Detroit
| 
| Buddy Hield (22)
| Chimezie Metu (10)
| Tyrese Haliburton (10)
| Little Caesars Arena10,092
| 6–8
|-style="background:#fcc;"
| 15
| November 17
| @ Minnesota
| 
| De'Aaron Fox (28)
| Tristan Thompson (9)
| De'Aaron Fox (5)
| Target Center13,108
| 6–9
|-style="background:#fcc;"
| 16
| November 19
| Toronto
| 
| De'Aaron Fox (17)
| Jones, Metu (9)
| Davion Mitchell (4)
| Golden 1 Center13,159
| 6–10
|-style="background:#fcc;"
| 17
| November 20
| Utah
| 
| Richaun Holmes (22)
| Harrison Barnes (8)
| Harrison Barnes (5)
| Golden 1 Center13,180
| 6–11
|-style="background:#fcc;"
| 18
| November 22
| Philadelphia
| 
| De'Aaron Fox (23)
| Richaun Holmes (8)
| Tyrese Haliburton (9)
| Golden 1 Center13,948
| 6–12
|-style="background:#cfc;"
| 19
| November 24
| Portland
| 
| Buddy Hield (22)
| Bagley III, Thompson (8)
| Haliburton, Fox (6) 
| Golden 1 Center14,997
| 7–12
|-style="background:#cfc;"
| 20
| November 26
| @ L.A. Lakers
| 
| De'Aaron Fox (34)
| Len, Metu (8)
| Tyrese Haliburton (9)
| Staples Center18,997
| 8–12
|-style="background:#fcc;"
| 21
| November 28
| @ Memphis
| 
| Buddy Hield (14)
| Chimezie Metu (11)
| Davion Mitchell (6)
| FedEx Forum12,844
| 8–13
|-style="background:#fcc;"
| 22
| November 30
| L.A. Lakers
| 
| Richaun Holmes (27)
| Chimezie Metu (11)
| Tyrese Haliburton (6)
| Golden 1 Center12,459
| 8–14

|-style="background:#cfc;"
| 23
| December 1
| @ L.A. Clippers
| 
| De'Aaron Fox (24)
| Richaun Holmes (11)
| Tyrese Haliburton (11)
| Staples Center17,217
| 9–14
|-style="background:#cfc;"
| 24
| December 4
| L.A. Clippers
| 
| Terence Davis (28)
| Marvin Bagley III (11)
| Fox, Haliburton (5)
| Golden 1 Center15,004
| 10–14
|-style="background:#cfc;"
| 25
| December 8
| Orlando
| 
| De'Aaron Fox (33)
| Tristan Thompson (10)
| Tyrese Haliburton (11)
| Golden 1 Center14,364
| 11–14
|-style="background:#fcc;"
| 26
| December 10
| @ Charlotte
| 
| De'Aaron Fox (31)
| Marvin Bagley III (10)
| Tyrese Haliburton (7)
| Spectrum Center16,335
| 11–15
|-style="background:#fcc;"
| 27
| December 11
| @ Cleveland
| 
| Buddy Hield (21)
| Marvin Bagley III (7)
| Davion Mitchell (5)
| Rocket Mortgage FieldHouse19,432
| 11–16
|-style="background:#fcc;"
| 28
| December 13
| @ Toronto
| 
| De'Aaron Fox (29)
| Marvin Bagley III (11)
| Davion Mitchell (6)
| Scotiabank Arena19,463
| 11–17
|-style="background:#cfc;"
| 29
| December 15
| Washington
| 
| De'Aaron Fox (28)
| Tyrese Haliburton (8)
| Tyrese Haliburton (9)
| Golden 1 Center13,806
| 12–17
|-style="background:#fcc;"
| 30
| December 17
| Memphis
| 
| Tyrese Haliburton (21)
| Chimezie Metu (11)
| Tyrese Haliburton (10)
| Golden 1 Center14,659
| 12–18
|-style="background:#cfc;"
| 31
| December 19
| San Antonio
| 
| Buddy Hield (29)
| Damian Jones (8)
| Tyrese Haliburton (11)
| Golden 1 Center15,091
| 13–18
|-style="background:#fcc;"
| 32
| December 20
| @ Golden State
| 
| Tyrese Haliburton (24)
| Tristan Thompson (9)
| Tyrese Haliburton (11)
| Chase Center18,064
| 13–19
|-style="background:#fcc;"
| 33
| December 22
| L.A. Clippers
| 
| Tyrese Haliburton (22)
| Chimezie Meru (10)
| Tyrese Haliburton (13)
| Golden 1 Center15,386
| 13–20
|-style="background:#fcc;"
| 34
| December 26
| Memphis
| 
| Tyrese Haliburton (18)
| Harrison Barnes (7)
| Tyrese Haliburton (7)
| Golden 1 Center15,685
| 13–21
|-style="background:#cfc;"
| 35
| December 28
| Oklahoma City
| 
| Tyrese Haliburton (24)
| Damian Jones (14)
| Tyrese Haliburton (10)
| Golden 1 Center14,750
| 14–21
|-style="background:#cfc;"
| 36
| December 29
| Dallas
| 
| De'Aaron Fox (16)
| Chimezie Metu (8)
| Tyrese Haliburton (10)
| Golden 1 Center16,071
| 15–21
|-style="background:#fcc;"
| 37
| December 31
| Dallas
| 
| Tyrese Haliburton (17)
| Tyrese Haliburton (10)
| Damian Jones (8)
| Golden 1 Center15,833
| 15–22
|-

|-style="background:#cfc;"
| 38
| January 2
| Miami
| 
| Buddy Hield (26)
| Damian Jones (10)
| Tyrese Haliburton (12)
| Golden 1 Center13,699
| 16–22
|-style="background:#fcc;"
| 39
| January 4
| @ L.A. Lakers
| 
| De'Aaron Fox (30)
| Marvin Bagley III (12)
| Tyrese Haliburton (9)
| Staples Center17,919
| 16–23
|-style="background:#fcc;"
| 40
| January 5
| Atlanta
| 
| De'Aaron Fox (30)
| Marvin Bagley III (12)
| De'Aaron Fox (6)
| Golden 1 Center13,104
| 16–24
|-style="background:#fcc;"
| 41
| January 7
| @ Denver
| 
| De'Aaron Fox (30)
| Alex Len (10)
| Tyrese Haliburton (6)
| Ball Arena15,966
| 16–25
|-style="background:#fcc;"
| 42
| January 9
| @ Portland
| 
| Tyrese Haliburton (17)
| Alex Len (10)
| Tyrese Haliburton (9)
| Moda Center16,408
| 16–26
|-style="background:#fcc;"
| 43
| January 10
| Cleveland
| 
| Tyrese Haliburton (21)
| Bagley III, Len (10)
| Tyrese Haliburton (8) 
| Golden 1 Center12,110
| 16–27
|-style="background:#cfc;"
| 44
| January 12
| L.A. Lakers
| 
| De'Aaron Fox (29)
| Marvin Bagley III (9)
| Tyrese Haliburton (10) 
| Golden 1 Center12,199
| 17–27
|-style="background:#cfc;"
| 45
| January 14
| Houston
| 
| De'Aaron Fox (27) 
| Marvin Bagley III (13) 
| Tyrese Haliburton (12) 
| Golden 1 Center12,857
| 18–27
|-style="background:#fcc;"
| 46
| January 16
| Houston
| 
| Buddy Hield (27)
| Chimezie Metu (7)
| Davion Mitchell (7)
| Golden 1 Center13,601
| 18–28
|-style="background:#fcc;"
| 47
| January 19
| Detroit
| 
| Terence Davis (35)
| Marvin Bagley III (9)
| De'Aaron Fox (8) 
| Golden 1 Center12,907
| 18–29
|-style="background:#fcc;"
| 48
| January 22
| @ Milwaukee
| 
| Harrison Barnes (29)
| Buddy Hield (8)
| Tyrese Haliburton (12)
| Fiserv Forum17,341
| 18–30
|-style="background:#fcc;"
| 49
| January 25
| @ Boston
| 
| Buddy Hield (11)
| Richaun Holmes (9)
| Tyrese Haliburton (7)
| TD Garden19,156
| 18–31
|-style="background:#fcc;"
| 50
| January 26
| @ Atlanta
| 
| Harrison Barnes (28)
| Harrison Barnes (9)
| Tyrese Haliburton (7)
| State Farm Arena15,080
| 18–32
|-style="background:#fcc;"
| 51
| January 29
| @ Philadelphia
| 
| Tyrese Haliburton (38)
| Bagley III, Holmes (9)
| Tyrese Haliburton (7)
| Wells Fargo Center20,380
| 18–33
|-style="background:#fcc;"
| 52
| January 31
| @ New York
| 
| Tyrese Haliburton (21)
| Richaun Holmes (7)
| Tyrese Haliburton (8)
| Madison Square Garden15,925
| 18–34
|-

|-style="background:#cfc;"
| 53
| February 2
| Brooklyn
| 
| Harrison Barnes (19)
| Chimezie Metu (12)
| Tyrese Haliburton (11)
| Golden 1 Center13,153
| 19–34
|-style="background:#fcc;"
| 54
| February 3
| @ Golden State
| 
| Davion Mitchell (26)
| Tyrese Haliburton (6)
| Davion Mitchell (8)
| Chase Center18,064
| 19–35
|-style="background:#cfc;"
| 55
| February 5
| Oklahoma City
| 
| Harrison Barnes (24)
| Maurice Harkless (11)
| Tyrese Haliburton (17)
| Golden 1 Center14,097
| 20–35
|-style="background:#fcc;"
| 56
| February 8
| Minnesota
|  
| De'Aaron Fox (29)
| Chimezie Metu (8)
| De'Aaron Fox (6)
| Golden 1 Center12,409
| 20–36
|-style="background:#cfc;"
| 57
| February 9
| Minnesota
|  
| Harrison Barnes (30)
| Domantas Sabonis (14)
| Davion Mitchell (7)
| Golden 1 Center12,527
| 21–36
|-style="background:#cfc;"
| 58
| February 12
| @ Washington
|  
| De'Aaron Fox (26)
| Domantas Sabonis (11)
| Domantas Sabonis (7)
| Capital One Arena14,169
| 22–36
|-style="background:#fcc;"
| 59
| February 14
| @ Brooklyn
|  
| De'Aaron Fox (26)
| Domantas Sabonis (9)
| De'Aaron Fox (3)
| Barclays Center16,873
| 22–37
|-style="background:#fcc;"
| 60
| February 16
| @ Chicago
|  
| De'Aaron Fox (33)
| Domantas Sabonis (12)
| De'Aaron Fox (9)
| United Center19,166
| 22–38
|-style="background:#fcc;"
| 61
| February 24
| Denver
| 
| Domantas Sabonis (33)
| Domantas Sabonis (14)
| Domantas Sabonis (5)
| Golden 1 Center15,855
| 22–39
|-style="background:#fcc;"
| 62
| February 26
| @ Denver
| 
| De'Aaron Fox (26)
| Domantas Sabonis (16)
| De'Aaron Fox (10)
| Ball Arena19,520
| 22–40
|-style="background:#cfc;"
| 63
| February 28
| @ Oklahoma City
| 
| De'Aaron Fox (29)
| Domantas Sabonis (16)
| De'Aaron Fox (10)
| Paycom Center13,945
| 23–40
|-

|-style="background:#fcc;"
| 64
| March 2
| @ New Orleans
|  
| De'Aaron Fox (25)
| Domantas Sabonis (14)
| Domantas Sabonis (7)
| Smoothie King Center15,490
| 23–41
|-style="background:#cfc;"
| 65
| March 3
| @ San Antonio
|  
| Harrison Barnes (27)
| Domantas Sabonis (12)
| De'Aaron Fox (9)
| AT&T Center13,049
| 24–41
|-style="background:#fcc;"
| 66
| March 5
| @ Dallas
|  
| De'Aaron Fox (44)
| Domantas Sabonis (10)
| Fox, Sabonis (6)
| American Airlines Center20,060
| 24–42
|-style="background:#fcc;"
| 67
| March 7
| New York
| 
| De'Aaron Fox (24)
| Domantas Sabonis (13)
| De'Aaron Fox (7)
| Golden 1 Center14,720
| 24–43
|-style="background:#fcc;"
| 68
| March 9
| Denver
| 
| De'Aaron Fox (32)
| Trey Lyles (9)
| De'Aaron Fox (10)
| Golden 1 Center14,697
| 24–44
|-style="background:#fcc;"
| 69
| March 12
| @ Utah
| 
| De'Aaron Fox (41)
| Richaun Holmes (6)
| De'Aaron Fox (11)
| Vivint Arena18,306
| 24–45
|-style="background:#cfc;"
| 70
| March 14
| Chicago
| 
| De'Aaron Fox (34)
| Trey Lyles (11)
| Barnes, Fox (6)
| Golden 1 Center15,943
| 25–45
|-style="background:#fcc;"
| 71
| March 16
| Milwaukee
| 
| Domantas Sabonis (22)
| Trey Lyles (12)
| Fox, Sabonis (7)
| Golden 1 Center15,864
| 25–46
|-style="background:#fcc;"
| 72
| March 18
| Boston
| 
| Domantas Sabonis (30)
| Domantas Sabonis (20)
| Donte DiVincenzo (8)
| Golden 1 Center15,313
| 25–47
|-style="background:#fcc;"
| 73
| March 20
| Phoenix
| 
| Davion Mitchell (28)
| Domantas Sabonis (12)
| Davion Mitchell (9)
| Golden 1 Center17,583
| 25–48
|-style="background:#cfc;"
| 74
| March 23
| @ Indiana
| 
| Davion Mitchell (25)
| DiVincenzo, Jones (6)
| Donte DiVincenzo (8)
| Gainbridge Fieldhouse14,227
| 26–48
|-style="background:#cfc;"
| 75
| March 26
| @ Orlando
| 
| Davion Mitchell (22) 
| Trey Lyles (18)
| Davion Mitchell (9)  
| Amway Center16,366
| 27–48
|-style="background:#fcc;"
| 76
| March 28
| @ Miami
| 
| Davion Mitchell (21) 
| Chimezie Metu (9)
| Davion Mitchell (9) 
| FTX Arena19,600
| 27–49
|-style="background:#cfc;"
| 77
| March 30
| @ Houston
| 
| Jones, Lyles, Mitchell (24)
| Damian Jones (9)
| Davion Mitchell (8) 
| Toyota Center13,365
| 28–49
|-

|-style="background:#cfc;"
| 78
| April 1
| @ Houston
| 
| Harrison Barnes (25)
| Damian Jones (17)  
| Davion Mitchell (10)
| Toyota Center14,857
| 29–49
|-style="background:#fcc;"
| 79
| April 3
| Golden State
| 
| Harrison Barnes (18)
| Harrison Barnes (10)
| Davion Mitchell (9)
| Golden 1 Center17,583
| 29–50
|-style="background:#fcc;"
| 80
| April 5
| New Orleans
| 
| Damian Jones (22)
| Harrison Barnes (6)
| Davion Mitchell (17)
| Golden 1 Center16,047
| 29–51
|-style="background:#fcc;"
| 81
| April 9
| @ L.A. Clippers
| 
| Davion Mitchell (22)
| Chimezie Metu (10)
| Davion Mitchell (7)
| Staples Center17,568
| 29-52
|-style="background:#cfc;"
| 82
| April 10
| @ Phoenix
| 
| Jones,Holiday, DiVincenzo (19)
| Lyles, Metu (7)
| Davion Mitchell (15)
| Footprint Center17,071
| 30-52

Transactions

Trades

Free agency

Re-signed

Additions

Subtractions

Notes

References

Sacramento Kings seasons
Sacramento Kings
Sacramento Kings
Sacramento Kings